Visakhapatnam–Koraput Intercity Express runs between Visakhapatnam City in Andhra Pradesh and Koraput in Odisha. The train runs through Vizianagaram, Rayagada and Damanjodi. It is numbered 18511/18512 by Indian Railways. The train is maintained by East Coast Railway Zone. The train is hauled by a WDM-3A locomotive of the Visakhapatnam shed.

Time Table
18511- Koraput to Visakhapatnam 

18512- Visakhapatnam to Koraput

Coaches
The rake composition is SLR, UR, UR, D1, UR, UR, UR, UR, UR, SLR making a total 10 coaches  Koraput Junction to Visakhapatnam Junction 18512 Visakhapatnam Junction to Koraput Junction.

This train has Rake Sharing Arrangement with 18411/18412 Visakhapatnam-Bhubaneswar Intercity Express.

References

Transport in Visakhapatnam
Transport in Koraput
Rail transport in Odisha
Rail transport in Andhra Pradesh
Intercity Express (Indian Railways) trains